Ópera prima is a 1980 Spanish comic film directed by Fernando Trueba and starring Óscar Ladoire. It was written by Ladoire and Trueba. It is one of the most acclaimed Spanish Cinema films of the eighties. It is considered and iconic example of the comedia madrileña.

Synopsis
Matías, a young man recently separated from his wife, falls in love with his cousin Violeta, a girl passionate about violin and hippie style.

Cast 
  ... Matías
  ... Violeta
 Antonio Resines ... León
 Luis González Regueral ... Nicky
 Kiti Mánver ... Ana
 Alejandro Serna ... Nicolás
 Marisa Paredes ... Zoila Gómez
 David Thomson ... Warren Belch
 Tony Valento ... Hombre del supermercado
 El Gran Wyoming ... Macarra

Reception 
In May 1980, in  wrote:
  (Trueba, lover of dream epics speaks of what he sees, with tenderness, with sarcasm, with freshness, without solemnity, without looking for definitive exits, without asking for anything, with intelligence. Opera prima, comedy, piece of life, purity in motion, jump into the ring without shells that scare away danger.)

Awards 
 Venice Film Festival  
 Young Talent Award (Fernando Trueba)
 Best actor
 
  (Óscar Ladoire)

References

External links 
 
 
 

1980 films
1980s Spanish-language films
Spanish comedy films
Films directed by Fernando Trueba
Culture in Madrid